Barbour is a surname of Scottish origin. Notable people with the surname include:

Alexander Barbour (1862–1930), Scottish international footballer
Anna Maynard Barbour (d.1941), an American author
Conway Barbour (1818–1876), American former slave and Arkansas state legislator
Dave Barbour (1912–1965), an American jazz guitarist
Edward A. Barbour Jr., an American politician
Eilidh Barbour (b.1982), Scottish television presenter and reporter
Erwin Hinckley Barbour (1856–1947), an American geologist and paleontologist
George Brown Barbour (1890-1977), Scottish geologist and educator
Haley Reeves Barbour (b.1947), an American attorney, politician, and lobbyist who served as the 63rd Governor of Mississippi
Henry Gray Barbour (1886–1943), American physiologist and pharmacologist
Ian Barbour (1923–2013), an American scholar on the relationship between science and religion
James Barbour (1775–1842), the 18th Governor of Virginia, U.S. Senator, and United States Secretary of War
James Barbour (1828–1895), Virginia lawyer, planter, politician, and Confederate officer
James Stacy Barbour (born 1966), an American singer and theatre actor
John Barbour (–1395), a Scottish poet and the first major named literary figure to write in Scots
John Barbour (actor) (b.1933), a Canadian actor, comedian, and television host who has worked extensively in the United States
John S. Barbour Jr. (1820–1892), a U.S. Representative and a Senator from Virginia
Josephus Pius Barbour (1894–1974), American Baptist pastor
Julian Barbour (b.1937), a British physicist with research interests in quantum gravity and the history of science
Lucius A. Barbour (1846–1922), American general
Mary Barbour (1875–1958), a Scottish political activist
Nelson H. Barbour (1824–1905), a Millerite Adventist writer and publisher
Philip Lemont Barbour (1898–1980), an American linguist, historian, and radio broadcaster 
Philip P. Barbour (1783–1841), 10th Speaker of the U.S. House of Representatives and an associate justice of the U.S. Supreme Court, brother of James Barbour
Ralph Henry Barbour (1870–1944), an American author of sports fiction for boys
Robert Barbour (New South Wales politician) (1827–1895), Australian politician, merchant, and squatter
Robert Barbour (Victorian politician) (–1914), Australian politician
Robert Barbour (RAF officer) (1895–1980), Scottish World War I flying ace
Robert Barbour (cricketer) (1899–1994), Australian cricketer
Robin Barbour (1921–2014), Church of Scotland minister and author
Samuel Barbour (1860–1938), an Australian chemist, photographer, and X-ray pioneer
Thomas Barbour (1884–1946), an American herpetologist
Thomas Barbour Lathrop (1847–1927), an American philanthropist and world traveler, grandson of James Barbour
Tommy Barbour (1887–1967), Scottish footballer
Walworth Barbour (1908–1982), a United States Ambassador to Israel 
William Warren Barbour (1888–1943), a US Senator from New Jersey

Notable people with the given name Barbour include:

Arthur Bruce Barbour Moore (1906–2004), Canadian Moderator of the United Church of Canada, President and Vice-Chancellor of Victoria University in the University of Toronto
Barbour Lewis (1818–1893), an American politician and a member of the U.S. House of Representatives for Tennessee

See also
Barbour County, Alabama
Barbour County, West Virginia
J. Barbour and Sons, a British clothing manufacturer
Mount Barbour, a mountain in Canada
Barber (disambiguation)